Petunia is an English and Scottish feminine given name. It originated in the English language as after a flower.

Usage
This name is given to fictional characters such as Petunia from Happy Tree Friends, Petunia Rhubarb from VeggieTales, Petunia from The Angry Birds Movie, Petunia Pretty Paws from Geronimo Stilton, and even Petunia Dursley from Harry Potter. It is also a common pet name.

In Germany, Petunia ranked at number 73 in popularity for names found in the Harry Potter books in the baby name statistics for the years 2006 to 2015.

References

English feminine given names
Scottish feminine given names
German feminine given names